Shahidul Alam (born 1955) is a Bangladeshi photographer.

Shahidul Alam may also refer to:

Shahidul Alam Sachchu (1982–2016), Bangladeshi actor
Shahedul Alam Shahed (born 1991), Bangladeshi midfielder
Shahidul Alam Sohel (born 1991), Bangladeshi goalkeeper
Shahidul Alam Talukder (fl. 2001–2006), Bangladeshi politician